The Brotherhood of the Rose is the first novel in a trilogy by  David Morrell, first published in 1983. It is followed by  The Fraternity of the Stone (1985) and The League of Night and Fog (1987), and a short story, The Abelard Sanction.

Story 
The Brotherhood of the Rose tells the story of Saul and Chris, two orphans from Philadelphia. They are adopted by a man named Elliot, who treats the boys like his own children and raises them to become assassins, but when a mission goes wrong for Saul, and Chris is involved in an international incident, they begin to question their lives and their missions, and start to see Eliot in a new light.

In other media

Television

The novel was adapted by Gy Waldron as Brotherhood of the Rose, a two-part television movie directed by Marvin J. Chomsky.  The film starred Peter Strauss as Saul and David Morse as Chris.  The cast included Robert Mitchum, Connie Sellecca, and James Sikking.

Film
In 2007 Warner Bros. acquired the movie rights for a new film adaptation.  In 2009 actor Channing Tatum was reported to be one of the stars of the film.

Notes

External links
The Brother of the Rose at FantasticFiction.co.uk

The Brotherhood of the Rose at The New York Times Movies

1984 Canadian novels
Canadian thriller novels
Canadian novels adapted into films